John Pepper (1886–1938) was a Hungarian-Jewish Communist politician.

John Pepper may also refer to:

 John E. Pepper Jr., American businessman
 John Henry Pepper (1821–1900), British scientist and inventor
 John Randolph Pepper (born 1958), photographer and theatre director
 John Pepper (English MP) (1537–1603), English politician
 John Pepper (cricketer) (1922–2007), English cricketer